Horace is an unincorporated community in Greeley County, Nebraska, in the United States.

History
Horace, like Greeley County, was named for Horace Greeley, a newspaper editor and politician of the mid-19th century who encouraged western settlement with the motto  "Go West, young man".

A post office was established in Horace in 1890, and remained in operation until it was discontinued in 1942.

Several buildings still stand on the site.

References

Unincorporated communities in Greeley County, Nebraska
Unincorporated communities in Nebraska